Gephyrocharax is a genus of characins found in South America, Trinidad in the Caribbean, and Panama.

Species
There are currently 11 recognized species in this genus:
 Gephyrocharax atracaudata (Meek & Hildebrand, 1912)
 Gephyrocharax caucanus C. H. Eigenmann, 1912
 Gephyrocharax chocoensis C. H. Eigenmann, 1912
 Gephyrocharax intermedius Meek & Hildebrand, 1916
 Gephyrocharax major G. S. Myers, 1929
 Gephyrocharax martae Dahl, 1943
 Gephyrocharax melanocheir C. H. Eigenmann, 1912
 Gephyrocharax sinuensis Dahl, 1964
 Gephyrocharax torresi Vanegas-Ríos, Azpelicueta, Mirande & García Gonzáles, 2013 
 Gephyrocharax valencia C. H. Eigenmann, 1920
 Gephyrocharax venezuelae L. P. Schultz, 1944

References

Characidae